Florence Masnada (born 16 December 1968 in Vizille) is a retired French alpine skier, who won two bronze Olympic medals.

World Cup victories

Notes

1968 births
Living people
French female alpine skiers
Alpine skiers at the 1992 Winter Olympics
Alpine skiers at the 1994 Winter Olympics
Alpine skiers at the 1998 Winter Olympics
Olympic alpine skiers of France
Olympic bronze medalists for France
Olympic medalists in alpine skiing
FIS Alpine Ski World Cup champions
Medalists at the 1998 Winter Olympics
Medalists at the 1992 Winter Olympics